Walker Smith Jr. (May 3, 1921 – April 12, 1989), better known as Sugar Ray Robinson, was an American professional boxer who competed from 1940 to 1965. He was inducted into the International Boxing Hall of Fame in 1990. He is often regarded as the greatest boxer of all time, pound-for-pound.

Robinson was a dominant amateur, but his exact amateur record is not known. It is usually listed as 85–0 with 69 knockouts, 40 in the first round. However it has been reported he lost to Billy Graham and Patsy Pesca as a teenager under his given name, Walker Smith Jr. He turned professional in 1940 at the age of 19 and by 1951 had a professional record of 129–1–2 with 85 knockouts. From 1943 to 1951 Robinson went on a 91-fight unbeaten streak, the third-longest in professional boxing history. Robinson held the world welterweight title from 1946 to 1951, and won the world middleweight title in the latter year. He retired in 1952, only to come back two-and-a-half years later and regain the middleweight title in 1955.

He then became the first boxer in history to win a divisional world championship five times (a feat he accomplished by defeating Carmen Basilio in 1958 to regain the middleweight championship). Robinson was named "fighter of the year" twice: first for his performances in 1942, then nine years and over 90 fights later, for his efforts in 1951. Historian Bert Sugar ranked Robinson as the greatest fighter of all time and in 2002, Robinson was also ranked number one on The Ring magazine's list of "80 Best Fighters of the Last 80 Years". As of November 2021, BoxRec ranks Robinson as the greatest boxer, pound-for-pound, of all time. He was named the best boxer of all time, pound for pound, by the International Boxing Research Organization (IBRO) in both of its all-time ratings, in 2006 and 2019.

Renowned for his classy and flamboyant lifestyle outside the ring, Robinson is credited with being the originator of the modern sports "entourage". After his boxing career ended, Robinson attempted a career as an entertainer, but it was not successful. He struggled financially until his death in 1989. In 2006, he was featured on a commemorative stamp by the United States Postal Service.

Early life
Robinson was born Walker Smith Jr. in Ailey, Georgia, to Walker Smith Sr. and Leila Hurst. Robinson was the youngest of three children; his eldest sister Marie was born in 1917, and his other sister Evelyn in 1919. His father was a cotton, peanut, and corn farmer in Georgia, who moved the family to Detroit where he initially found work in construction. According to Robinson, Smith Sr. later worked two jobs to support his family—cement mixer and sewer worker. "He had to get up at six in the morning and he'd get home close to midnight. Six days a week. The only day I really saw him was Sunday... I always wanted to be with him more."

His parents separated, and he moved with his mother to the New York City neighborhood of Harlem at the age of 12. Robinson originally aspired to be a doctor, but after dropping out of DeWitt Clinton High School (in the Bronx) in ninth grade, he switched his goal to boxing.

When he was 14, he attempted to enter his first boxing tournament, but was told he first needed an AAU membership card—which he could not legally procure until he was 16. He circumvented the AAU's age requirement by using an ID card from a youth named Ray Robinson, who had quit boxing. So, Walker began his amateur fighting career under that name—and it stuck. Later, when a lady in the audience at a fight in Watertown, New York, said he was "sweet as sugar," the name "Sugar Ray Robinson" was born.

Robinson idolized Henry Armstrong and Joe Louis as a youth, and actually had lived on the same block as Louis in Detroit when Robinson was 11 and Louis was 17. Outside the ring, Robinson got into trouble frequently as a youth, and was involved with a street gang. He married at 16. The couple had one son, Ronnie, and divorced when Robinson was 19.

He reportedly finished his amateur career with an 85–0 record with 69 knockouts – 40 coming in the first round, though this has been disputed. He won the New York Golden Gloves featherweight championship in 1939 (defeating Louis Valentine on points in 3 rounds), and the New York Golden Gloves lightweight championship in 1940 (defeating Andy Nonella by KO in 2).

Boxing career

Early career
Robinson made his professional debut on October 4, 1940, winning by a second-round stoppage over Joe Echevarria. Robinson fought five more times in 1940, winning all, four by knockout. In 1941, he defeated world champion Sammy Angott, future champion Marty Servo, and former champion Fritzie Zivic. The Robinson-Angott fight was held above the lightweight limit, since Angott did not want to risk losing his lightweight title. The Zivic bout, held at the Madison Square Garden, drew a crowd of 20,551—one of the largest in the arena to that date. Robinson won the first five rounds, according to Joseph C. Nichols of The New York Times, before Zivic came back to land several punches to Robinson's head in the sixth and seventh. Robinson controlled the next two, and had Zivic hurt in the ninth. After a close tenth round, Robinson was announced as the winner on all three scorecards.

Robinson knocked out Zivic in the tenth round in a January 1942 rematch, only the second time Zivic had been counted out in more than 150 fights. Robinson knocked him down in the ninth and tenth rounds before the referee stopped the fight. Zivic and his corner protested the stoppage; James P. Dawson of The New York Times stated "[t]hey were criticizing a humane act. The battle had been a slaughter, for want of a more delicate word." Robinson then won four consecutive bouts by knockout, before defeating Servo in a controversial split decision in their May rematch. After winning three more fights, Robinson faced Jake LaMotta, who would become one of his more prominent rivals, for the first time in October. He defeated LaMotta by a unanimous decision, although he failed to get Jake down. Robinson weighed  compared to 157.5 for LaMotta, but he was able to control the fight from the outside for the entire bout, and actually landed the harder punches during the fight. Robinson then won four more fights, including two against Izzy Jannazzo, from October 19 to December 14. For his performances, Robinson was named "Fighter of the Year". He finished 1942 with a total of 14 wins and no losses.

Robinson built a record of 40–0 before losing for the first time to LaMotta in a 10-round re-match. LaMotta, who had a  weight advantage over Robinson, knocked Robinson out of the ring in the eighth round, and won the fight by decision. The fight took place in Robinson's former home town of Detroit, and attracted a record crowd. After being controlled by Robinson in the early rounds  LaMotta came back to take control in the later. After winning the third LaMotta fight less than three weeks later, Robinson then defeated his childhood idol: former champion Henry Armstrong, whom he only fought because the older man was in need of money. Robinson later stated that he carried the aged former champion.

On February 27, 1943, Robinson was inducted into the United States Army, where he was again referred to as Walker Smith. Robinson had a 15-month military career. Robinson served with Joe Louis, and the pair went on tours with the Special Services division where they performed exhibition bouts in front of U.S. Army troops. Robinson got into trouble several times while in the military. He argued with superiors who he felt were discriminatory against him, and refused to fight exhibitions when he was told African American soldiers were not allowed to watch them.  In late March 1944 Robinson was stationed at Fort Hamilton in Brooklyn, waiting to ship out to Europe, where he was scheduled to perform more exhibition matches. But on March 29, Robinson disappeared from his barracks. When he woke up on April 5 in Fort Jay Hospital on Governor's Island, he had missed his sailing for Europe and was under suspicion of deserting. He himself reported falling down the stairs in his barracks on the 29th, but said that he had complete amnesia, and he could not remember any events from that moment until the 5th. According to his file, a stranger had found him in the street on April 1 and helped him to a hospital. In his examination report, a doctor at Fort Jay concluded that Robinson's version of events was sincere.  He was examined by military authorities, who claimed he suffered from a mental deficiency. Robinson was granted an honorable discharge on June 3, 1944. He later wrote that unfair press coverage of the incident had "branded" him as a "deserter". Robinson maintained his close friendship with Louis from their time in military service, and the two went into business together after the war. They planned to start a liquor distribution business in New York City, but were denied a license due to their race.

Besides the loss in the LaMotta rematch, the only other mark on Robinson's record during this period was a 10-round draw against José Basora in 1945.

Welterweight champion
By 1946, Robinson had fought 75 fights to a 73–1–1 record, and beaten every top contender in the welterweight division. However, he refused to cooperate with the Mafia, which controlled much of boxing at the time, and was denied a chance to fight for the welterweight championship. Robinson was finally given a chance to win a title against Tommy Bell on December 20, 1946. Robinson had already beaten Bell once by decision in 1945. The two fought for the title vacated by Servo, who had himself lost twice to Robinson in non-title bouts. In the fight, Robinson, who only a month before had been involved in a 10-round brawl with Artie Levine, was knocked down by Bell. The fight was called a "war", but Robinson was able to pull out a close 15-round decision, winning the vacant World Welterweight title.

In 1948 Robinson fought five times, but only one bout was a title defense. Among the fighters he defeated in those non-title bouts was future world champion Kid Gavilán in a close, controversial 10-round fight. Gavilán hurt Robinson several times in the fight, but Robinson controlled the final rounds with a series of jabs and left hooks. In 1949, he boxed 16 times, but again only defended his title once. In that title fight, a rematch with Gavilán, Robinson again won by decision. The first half of the bout was very close, but Robinson took control in the second half. Gavilán would have to wait two more years to begin his own historic reign as welterweight champion. The only boxer to match Robinson that year was Henry Brimm, who fought him to a 10-round draw in Buffalo.

Robinson fought 19 times in 1950. He successfully defended his welterweight title for the last time against Charley Fusari. Robinson won a lopsided 15-round decision, knocking Fusari down once. Robinson donated all but $1 of his purse for the Fusari fight to cancer research. In 1950 Robinson fought George Costner, who had also taken to calling himself "Sugar" and stated in the weeks leading up to the fight that he was the rightful possessor of the name. "We better touch gloves, because this is the only round", Robinson said as the fighters were introduced at the center of the ring. "Your name ain't Sugar, mine is." Robinson then knocked Costner out in 2 minutes and 49 seconds.

Jimmy Doyle incident
In June 1947, after four non-title bouts, Robinson was scheduled to defend his title for the first time in a bout against Jimmy Doyle. Robinson initially backed out of the fight because he had a dream that he was going to kill Doyle. A priest and a minister convinced him to fight. His dream ended up becoming a reality. On June 25, 1947, Robinson dominated Doyle and scored a decisive knockout in the eighth round that knocked Doyle unconscious and resulted in Doyle's death later that night. Robinson said that the impact of Doyle's death was "very trying".

After Doyle's death, criminal charges were threatened against Robinson in Cleveland, up to and including murder, though none actually materialized. After learning of Doyle's intentions of using the bout's money to buy his mother a house, Robinson gave Doyle's mother the money from his next four bouts so she could purchase herself a home, fulfilling her son's intention.

Middleweight champion
It is stated in his autobiography that one of the main considerations for his move up to middleweight was the increasing difficulty he was having in making the  welterweight weight limit. However, the move up would also prove beneficial financially, as the division then contained some of the biggest names in boxing. Vying for the Pennsylvania state middleweight title in 1950, Robinson defeated Robert Villemain. Later that year, in defense of that crown, he defeated Jose Basora, with whom he had previously drawn. Robinson's 50-second, first-round knockout of Basora set a record that would stand for 38 years. In October 1950, Robinson knocked out Bobo Olson a future middleweight title holder.

On February 14, 1951, Robinson and LaMotta met for the sixth time. The fight would become known as The St. Valentine's Day Massacre. Robinson won the undisputed World Middleweight title with a 13th round technical knockout. Robinson outboxed LaMotta for the first 10 rounds, then unleashed a series of savage combinations on LaMotta for three rounds, finally stopping the champion for the first time in their legendary six-bout series—and dealing LaMotta his first legitimate knockout loss in 95 professional bouts. LaMotta had lost by knockout to Billy Fox earlier in his career. However, that fight was later ruled to have been fixed and LaMotta was sanctioned for letting Fox win. That bout, and some of the other bouts in the six-fight Robinson-LaMotta rivalry, was depicted in the Martin Scorsese film Raging Bull. "I fought Sugar Ray so often, I almost got diabetes", LaMotta later said. Robinson won five of his six bouts with LaMotta.

After winning his second world title, he embarked on a European tour which took him all over the Continent. Robinson traveled with his flamingo-pink Cadillac, which caused quite a stir in Paris, and an entourage of 13 people, some included "just for laughs". He was a hero in France due to his recent defeat of LaMotta—the French hated LaMotta for defeating Marcel Cerdan in 1949 and taking his championship belt (Cerdan died in a plane crash en route to a rematch with LaMotta). Robinson met President of France Vincent Auriol at a ceremony attended by France's social upper crust. During his fight in Berlin against Gerhard Hecht, Robinson was disqualified when he knocked his opponent out with a punch to the kidney: a punch legal in the US, but not Europe. The fight was later declared a no-contest. In London, Robinson lost the world middleweight title to British boxer Randolph Turpin in a sensational bout. Three months later in a rematch in front of 60,000 fans at the Polo Grounds, he knocked Turpin out in ten rounds to recover the title. In that bout Robinson was leading on the cards but was cut by Turpin. With the fight in jeopardy, Robinson let loose on Turpin, knocking him down, then getting him to the ropes and unleashing a series of punches that caused the referee to stop the bout. Following Robinson's victory, residents of Harlem danced in the streets. In 1951, Robinson was named Ring Magazine's "Fighter of the Year" for the second time.

In 1952 he fought a rematch with Olson, winning by a decision. He next defeated former champion Rocky Graziano by a third-round knockout, then challenged World Light heavyweight champion Joey Maxim. In the Yankee Stadium bout with Maxim, Robinson built a lead on all three judges' scorecards, but the  temperature in the ring took its toll. The referee, Ruby Goldstein, was the first victim of the heat, and had to be replaced by referee Ray Miller. The fast-moving Robinson was the heat's next victim – at the end of round 13, he collapsed and failed to answer the bell for the next round, suffering the only knockout of his career.

On June 25, 1952, after the Maxim bout, Robinson gave up his title and retired with a record of 131–3–1–1. He began a career in show business, singing and tap dancing. After about three years, the decline of his businesses and the lack of success in his performing career made him decide to return to boxing. He resumed training in 1954.

Comeback
In 1955 Robinson returned to the ring. Although he had been inactive for two and a half years, his work as a dancer kept him in peak physical condition: in his autobiography, Robinson states that in the weeks leading up to his debut for a dancing engagement in France, he ran five miles every morning, and then danced for five hours each night. Robinson even stated that the training he did in his attempts to establish a career as a dancer were harder than any he undertook during his boxing career. He won five fights in 1955, before losing a decision to Ralph 'Tiger' Jones. He bounced back, however, and defeated Rocky Castellani by a split decision, then challenged Bobo Olson for the world middleweight title. He won the middleweight championship for the third time with a second-round knockout—his third victory over Olson. After his comeback performance in 1955, Robinson expected to be named fighter of the year. However, the title went to welterweight Carmen Basilio. Basilio's handlers had lobbied heavily for it on the basis that he had never won the award, and Robinson later described this as the biggest disappointment of his professional career. "I haven't forgotten it to this day, and I never will", Robinson wrote in his autobiography. Robinson and Olson fought for the last time in 1956, and Robinson closed the four-fight series with a fourth-round knockout.

In 1957 Robinson lost his title to Gene Fullmer. Fullmer used his aggressive, forward moving style to control Robinson, and knocked him down in the fight. Robinson, however, noticed that Fullmer was vulnerable to the left hook. Fullmer headed into their May rematch as a 3–1 favorite. In the first two rounds Robinson followed Fullmer around the ring, however in the third round he changed tactics and made Fullmer come to him. At the start of the fourth round Robinson came out on the attack and stunned Fullmer, and when Fullmer returned with his own punches, Robinson traded with him, as opposed to clinching as he had done in their earlier fight. The fight was fairly even after four rounds. But in the fifth, Robinson was able to win the title back for a fourth time by knocking out Fullmer with a lightning fast, powerful left hook. Boxing critics have referred to the left-hook which knocked out Fullmer as "the perfect punch". It marked the first time in 44 career fights that Fullmer had been knocked out, and when someone asked Robinson after the fight how far the left hook had travelled, Robinson replied: "I can't say. But he got the message."

Later that year, he lost his title to Basilio in a rugged 15 round fight in front of 38,000 at Yankee Stadium, but regained it for a record fifth time when he beat Basilio in the rematch. Robinson struggled to make weight, and had to go without food for nearly 20 hours leading up to the bout. He badly damaged Basilio's eye early in the fight, and by the seventh round it was swollen shut. The two judges gave the fight to Robinson by wide margins: 72–64 and 71–64. The referee scored the fight for Basilio 69–64, and was booed loudly by the crowd of 19,000 when his decision was announced. The first fight won the "Fight of the Year" award from The Ring magazine for 1957 and the second fight won the "Fight of the Year" award for 1958.

Decline

Robinson knocked out Bob Young in the second round in Boston in his only fight in 1959. A year later, he defended his title against Paul Pender. Robinson entered the fight as a 5–1 favorite, but lost a split decision in front of 10,608 at Boston Garden. The day before the fight Pender commented that he planned to start slowly, before coming on late. He did just that and outlasted the aging Robinson, who, despite opening a cut over Pender's eye in the eighth round, was largely ineffective in the later rounds. An attempt to regain the crown for an unheard of sixth time proved beyond Robinson. Despite Robinson's efforts, Pender won by decision in that rematch. On December 3 of that year, Robinson and Fullmer fought a 15-round draw for the WBA middleweight title, which Fullmer retained. In 1961, Robinson and Fullmer fought for a fourth time, with Fullmer retaining the WBA middleweight title by a unanimous decision. The fight would be Robinson's last title bout.

Robinson spent the rest of the 1960s fighting 10-round contests. In October 1961 Robinson defeated future world champion Denny Moyer by a unanimous decision. A 12–5 favorite, the 41-year-old Robinson defeated the 22-year-old Moyer by staying on the outside, rather than engaging him. In their rematch four months later, Moyer defeated Robinson on points, as he pressed the action and made Robinson back up throughout the fight. Moyer won 7–3 on all three judges scorecards. Robinson lost twice more in 1962, before winning six consecutive fights against mostly lesser opposition.  In February 1963 Robinson lost by a unanimous decision to former world champion and fellow Hall of Famer Joey Giardello. Giardello knocked Robinson down in the fourth round, and the 43-year-old took until the count of nine to rise to his feet. Robinson was also nearly knocked down in the sixth round, but was saved by the bell. He rallied in the seventh and eight rounds, before struggling in the final two. He then embarked on an 18-month boxing tour of Europe.

Robinson's second no-contest bout came in September 1965 in Norfolk, Virginia in a match with an opponent who turned out to be an impostor. Boxer Neil Morrison, at the time a fugitive and accused robber, signed up for the fight as Bill Henderson, a capable club fighter. The fight was a fiasco, with Morrison being knocked down twice in the first round and once in the second before the disgusted referee, who said "Henderson put up no fight", walked out of the ring. Robinson was initially given a TKO in 1:20 of the second round after the "obviously frightened" Morrison laid himself down on the canvas. Robinson fought for the final time in November 1965. He lost by a unanimous decision to Joey Archer. Famed sports author Pete Hamill mentioned that one of the saddest experiences of his life was watching Robinson lose to Archer. He was even knocked down and Hamill pointed out that Archer had no knockout punch at all; Archer admitted afterward that it was only the second time he had knocked an opponent down in his career. The crowd of 9,023 at the Civic Arena in Pittsburgh gave Robinson several standing ovations, even while he was being thoroughly outperformed by Archer.

On November 11, 1965, Robinson announced his retirement from boxing, saying: "I hate to go too long campaigning for another chance." Robinson retired from boxing with a record of 173–19–6 (2 no contests) with 109 knockouts in 200 professional bouts, ranking him among the all-time leaders in knockouts.

Later life
In his autobiography, Robinson states that by 1965 he was broke, having spent all of the $4 million in earnings he made inside and out of the ring during his career. A month after his last fight, Robinson was honored with a Sugar Ray Robinson Night on December 10, 1965, in New York's Madison Square Garden. During the ceremony, he was honored with a massive trophy. However, there was not a piece of furniture in his small Manhattan apartment with legs strong enough to support it. Robinson was elected to the Ring Magazine boxing Hall of Fame in 1967, two years after he retired and the International Boxing Hall of Fame in 1990. In the late 1960s he acted in some television shows, like Mission: Impossible. An episode of Land of the Giants called "Giants and All That Jazz" had Sugar as a washed up boxer opening a nightclub.  He also appeared in a few films including the Frank Sinatra cop movie The Detective (1968), the cult classic Candy (1968), and the thriller The Todd Killings (1971) as a police officer. In 1969, he founded the Sugar Ray Robinson Youth Foundation for the inner-city Los Angeles area. The foundation does not sponsor a boxing program. He was diagnosed with diabetes mellitus that was treated with insulin.

Death
In Robinson's last years he was diagnosed with Alzheimer's disease. He died in Los Angeles on April 12, 1989, at the age of 67. Robinson is buried at Inglewood Park Cemetery, Inglewood, California.

Personal life

Robinson married Marjorie Joseph in 1938; the marriage was annulled the same year. Their son, Ronnie Smith, was born in 1939. Robinson met his second wife Edna Mae Holly, a noted dancer who performed at the Cotton Club and toured Europe with Duke Ellington and Cab Calloway. According to Robinson, he met her at a local pool he frequented after his boxing workouts. In an attempt to get her attention he pushed her into the pool one day, and said it was an accident. After this attempt was met with disdain, he appeared at the nightclub she danced at and introduced himself. Soon the couple were dating and they married in 1944. They had one son, Ray Robinson Jr. (born 1949) before their acrimonious divorce in 1962. She appeared on the first cover of Jet magazine in 1951.

In April 1959, Robinson's eldest sister, Marie, died of cancer at the age of 41.

In December 1959, Barbara Johnson (aka Barbara Trevigne) of South Ozone Park, a singer and dancer, brought a paternity suit in New York against the former champ, claiming Sugar Ray Robinson was the father of her son Paul born in 1953. On May 18, 1963, Jet reported that the court had ruled in Robinson's favor. Robinson is quoted exulting at the win saying "Justice triumphed."

In 1965, Robinson married Millie Wiggins Bruce and the couple settled in Los Angeles. When Robinson was sick with his various ailments, his son accused the elder Robinson's wife of keeping him under the influence of medication to manipulate him. According to Ray Robinson Jr., when Robinson Sr's mother died, he could not attend his mother's funeral because Millie was drugging and controlling him. However, Robinson had been hospitalized the day before his mother's death due to agitation which caused his blood pressure to rise. Robinson Jr. and Edna Mae also said they were kept away from Robinson by Millie during the last years of his life.

Robinson was a Freemason, a membership shared with a number of other athletes, including fellow boxer Jack Dempsey.

Boxing style

Robinson was the modern definition of a boxer puncher. He was able to fight almost any style: he could come out one round brawling, the next counterpunching, and the next fighting on the outside flicking his jab. Robinson would use his formless style to exploit his opponents' weaknesses. He also possessed great speed and precision. He fought in a very conventional way with a firm jab, but threw hooks and uppercuts in flurries in an unconventional way. He possessed tremendous versatility—according to boxing analyst Bert Sugar, "Robinson could deliver a knockout blow going backward." Robinson was efficient with both hands, and he displayed a variety of effective punches—according to a Time article in 1951, "Robinson's repertoire, thrown with equal speed and power by either hand, includes every standard punch from a bolo to a hook—and a few he makes up on the spur of the moment." Robinson commented that once a fighter has trained to a certain level, their techniques and responses become almost reflexive. "You don't think. It's all instinct. If you stop to think, you're gone."

Legacy

Robinson has been ranked as the greatest boxer of all time by sportswriters, fellow boxers, and trainers. The phrase "pound for pound" was created by sportswriters for him during his career as a way to compare boxers irrespective of weight. Hall of Fame fighters Muhammad Ali, Joe Louis, Roberto Durán and Sugar Ray Leonard have ranked Robinson as the greatest pound-for-pound boxer in history. In 1997, The Ring ranked him as the best pound-for-pound fighter in history, and in 1999 he was named "welterweight of the century", "middleweight of the century", and overall "fighter of the century" by the Associated Press.  In 2007 ESPN.com featured the piece "50 Greatest Boxers of All Time", in which it named Robinson the top boxer in history. In 2003, The Ring ranked him number 11 in the list of all-time greatest punchers.  Robinson was also ranked as the number 1 welterweight and the number 1 pound-for-pound boxer of all time by the International Boxing Research Organization. He was inducted into the Madison Square Garden Walk of Fame at its inception in 1992.

Robinson was one of the first African Americans to establish himself as a star outside sports. He was an integral part of the New York social scene in the 1940s and 1950s. His glamorous restaurant, Sugar Ray's, hosted stars including Frank Sinatra, Jackie Gleason, Nat King Cole, Joe Louis, and Lena Horne. Robinson was known as a flamboyant personality outside the ring. He combined striking good looks with charisma and a flair for the dramatic. He drove a flamingo-pink Cadillac and was an accomplished singer and dancer, who once pursued a career in the entertainment industry.

According to ESPN's Ron Flatter: "He was the pioneer of boxing's bigger-than-life entourages, including a secretary, barber, masseur, voice coach, a coterie of trainers, beautiful women, a dwarf mascot and lifelong manager George Gainford." When Robinson first traveled to Paris, a steward referred to his companions as his "entourage". Although Robinson said he did not like the word's literal definition of "attendants", since he felt they were his friends, he liked the word itself and began to use it in regular conversation when referring to them. In 1962, in an effort to persuade Robinson to return to Paris—where he was still a national hero—the French promised to bring over his masseur, his hairdresser, a man who would whistle while he trained, and his trademark Cadillac. This larger-than-life persona made him the idol of millions of African American youths in the 1950s. Robinson inspired several other fighters who took the nickname "Sugar" in homage to him: Sugar Ray Leonard, Sugar Shane Mosley, and MMA fighter "Suga" Rashad Evans.

Professional boxing record

See also
 List of welterweight boxing champions
 List of middleweight boxing champions
 The Ring pound for pound

Notes

References

Bibliography
 Boyd, Herb, and Robinson, Ray II. Pound for Pound: A Biography of Sugar Ray Robinson, New York: HarperCollins, 2005 
 Chenault, Julie. Edna Mae Robinson Still Looking Good in Her Mink. Jet, Johnson Publishing Company November 5, 1981, issue  (available online)
 Donelson, Thomas, and Lotierzo, Frank. Viewing Boxing from Ringside, Lincoln: iUniverse, 2002 
 Fitzgerald, Mike H., and Hudson, Dabid L. Boxing's Most Wanted: The Top Ten Book of Champs, Chumps and Punch-drunk Palookas, Virginia: Brassey's, 2004 
 Hauser, Thomas. The Black Lights: Inside the World of Professional Boxing, Fayetteville: University of Arkansas Press, 2000 
 Nagler, Barney. "Boxing's Bad Boy: Sugar Ray Robinson". SPORT Magazine. October 1947.
 Robinson, Sugar Ray, and Anderson, Dave. Sugar Ray, London: Da Capo Press, 1994 
 Sammons, Jeffrey Thomas. Beyond the Ring: The Role of Boxing in American Society, Urbana: University of Illinois Press, 1998 
 Wiley, Ralph. Serenity: A Boxing Memoir, Lincoln: University of Nebraska Press, 2000

External links

 
 
 Sugar Ray Robinson Biography – Fightfanatics.com
 Image of Sugar Ray Robinson after bout with Carl (Bobo) Olson, Los Angeles, 1956. Los Angeles Times Photographic Archive (Collection 1429). UCLA Library Special Collections, Charles E. Young Research Library, University of California, Los Angeles.
 Image of Sugar Ray Robinson receives physical exam before fight, Los Angeles, 1956. Los Angeles Times Photographic Archive (Collection 1429). UCLA Library Special Collections, Charles E. Young Research Library, University of California, Los Angeles.
 National Boxing Association Strips Robinson of World Middleweight Title; New York Retains May 15 Deadline The New York Times
 1947 Quarterly Ratings
 1948 Quarterly Ratings
 1949 Quarterly Ratings
 1950 Quarterly Ratings
 1951 Quarterly Ratings
 1952 Quarterly Ratings
 1955 Quarterly Ratings
 1956 Quarterly Ratings
 1957 Quarterly Ratings
 1958 Quarterly Ratings
 1959 Quarterly Ratings
 The story of his life is retold in the radio drama "Premonition of the Panther", a presentation from Destination Freedom

1921 births
1989 deaths
African-American boxers
World middleweight boxing champions
World welterweight boxing champions
American Freemasons
Burials at Inglewood Park Cemetery
Deaths from Alzheimer's disease
Deaths from diabetes
Deaths from dementia in California
International Boxing Hall of Fame inductees
Middleweight boxers
Military personnel from Georgia (U.S. state)
People from Montgomery County, Georgia
Boxers from Detroit
Boxers from Georgia (U.S. state)
Sportspeople from Manhattan
Welterweight boxers
American male boxers
Boxers from New York City
United States Army soldiers
20th-century African-American sportspeople